Robert Otho Hanig is an American politician who is a member of the North Carolina Senate, representing District 3. He was appointed by North Carolina Governor Roy Cooper to serve the remainder of Senator Bob Steinburg’s term representing District 1 following Sen. Steinburg’s resignation to seek the Republican nomination in Senate District 2. Hanig was first elected to the North Carolina House of Representatives after defeating incumbent Beverly Boswell in the primary election for House District 6  Hanig is an Army veteran and owns The Pool Guy Aquatic Services.

Background
After serving in the U.S. Army, Hanig moved to the Outer Banks and serviced rental properties. A few years later he started his own pool business and created a property management business.

Platform
On his campaign Facebook account, Hanig expressed his dislike for the Affordable Care Act. Hanig also states that he is pro-life and a supporter of HB2. He was endorsed by the NRA and posted about it on his campaign Facebook page.

Currituck County Commissioner
In 2016, Hanig was encouraged to involve himself in giving back to the community and joined the election for Currituck County Commissioner.

Hanig was elected to the Currituck Board of Commissioners after running unopposed in the Republican primary in March 2016. He was elected as chairman in December 2016. As commissioner, Hanig expressed his dislike for solar farms in Currituck County, by saying "[l]arge solar projects haven't been a good deal for Currituck County residents".

Upon winning the election and becoming the chair for the Country Commission, Hanig focused on the local economy and the finances of the Currituck school. His main purpose was to see if taxpayer money was spent wisely. He also hopes to cut the red tape that hurts local businesses, lower taxes, and create jobs in the area.

He voted in 2017 to ban all future solar facility development. During his tenure as county commissioner, Currituck County paid $50,000 to a company owned by Rep. Bob Steinburg to promote a basketball tournament in Western NC.

Steinburg said he cleared the potential arrangement with state ethics officials before approaching Currituck .  Currituck Travel and Tourism Director Tameron Kugler maintained the sponsorship offers the county valuable nationwide exposure.

Currituck County Manager Dan Scanlon  said Steinburg's request went through Currituck's tourism board, and Currituck vetted his proposal as it would any other. That included review by County Attorney Ike McRee, based on an “action history” Currituck provided with the contract.

After moving to the North Carolina House of Representatives,  the Currituck Republican party selected educator Selina Jarvis as their nominee to replace Bobby Hanig on the county Board of Commissioners.

2018
Hanig defeated Rep. Beverly Boswell in a Republican Primary.

Hanig defeated Tess Judge by a 55 to 45 percent in the general election.

Hanig sponsored six bills in his first term. The bills included one that gave the College of the Albemarle the liberty to use state funds for building projects along with Dare County for educational facilities. Another bill was for the isolated schools in Currituck county and improving the transportation efficiency budget for the schools in Currituck County. Another bill passed by Hanig  dealt with local regulation of navigable water and the restoration of the Federal Protecting Tenants at Foreclosure Act. Also, a bill to make bottlenose dolphin North Carolina's marine mammal was passed the House through him and it was directed to the Senate Rules Committee.

2020

Hanig beat Rob Rollason in March 2020. During the campaign, Hanig and Rollason talked about local issues like wind and solar energy projects.  Hanig claimed to be a free-market person.

Hanig was a big  supporter of the Dare County Board of Commissioners declaring the county a  Second Amendment Sanctuary.

In January 2020, the Currituck County commissioners adopted a resolution declaring the county a Second Amendment Refuge, adding Currituck to a growing list of North Carolina counties seeking to support a citizen's right to bear arms.  Hanig spoke in support of the resolution. Hanig urged the board, he formerly chaired, to support the resolution, saying he would oppose any “assault” on the Second Amendment in the General Assembly.

2022
Following redistricting in the North Carolina General Assembly after the 2020 United States Census, Hanig's 6th district was dismantled. Most of Hanig's constituents were drawn into the 79th district represented by two term Republican representative Keith Kidwell, but Hanig's home in Powells Point was drawn into the 1st district, represented by another two term Republican Representative, Ed Goodwin. Instead of facing Goodwin or Kidwell in a GOP primary, Hanig instead announced he would run for the North Carolina Senate in District 3 in 2022. Following Bob Steinburg's resignation on July 31, 2022, Hanig was appointed to finish the balance of his term in the state senate.

References

|-

|-

Living people
Year of birth missing (living people)
People from Currituck County, North Carolina
21st-century American politicians
County commissioners in North Carolina
North Carolina Republicans
Members of the North Carolina House of Representatives
Republican Party members of the North Carolina House of Representatives
North Carolina state senators
Republican Party North Carolina state senators